Dual-purpose is a noun and adjective referring to things serving two purposes. It can specifically refer to:

 Dual-use technology
 Dual-purpose gun, a naval artillery mounting designed to engage both surface and air targets
 Dual-Purpose Improved Conventional Munition
 Dual-purpose motorcycle, designed for both on- and off-road use
 Dual Purpose Ladder (London Fire Brigade), a standard type of firefighting vehicle used by the London Fire Brigade
 Fighting knife
 Viaduct, a road bridge-aqueduct
 Dual-purpose breed, an animal or plant breed that provide at least 2 kinds of resources, for example, beef cattle

See also
 Dual (disambiguation)
 Purpose (disambiguation)
 Hybrid (disambiguation)
 Multi-purpose (disambiguation)
 Single-purpose (disambiguation)